The 1982 William & Mary Tribe football team represented the College of William & Mary as an independent during the 1982 NCAA Division I-AA football season. Led by Jimmye Laycock in his third year as head coach, William & Mary finished the season with a record of 3–8.

Schedule

References

William and Mary
William & Mary Tribe football seasons
William and Mary Indians football